Sigma Cygni, Latinised from σ Cygni, is a blue supergiant star in the constellation Cygnus. Its apparent magnitude is 4.2. It belongs to the Cygnus OB4 stellar association and is located approximately 3,300 light years away from Earth.

Because of its location in the galactic disk, σ Cyg is obstructed by interstellar dust and is reddened by around 0.2 magnitudes and loses about 0.6 magnitudes at visual wavelengths.  Allowing for this, the star is over 50,000 times as luminous as the sun.

Spectral analysis of the star showed that photospheric SiII and HeI lines display a simultaneous, periodic variability. The periodicity was calculated at 1.59 hours in all three lines and it might be the result of stellar oscillations.  No clear variation in the brightness has been detected.

The elemental composition of Sigma Cygni is unusual. The star is enriched in helium, and has extremely high concentrations of nitrogen, calcium, cerium and europium, while carbon and aluminum are depleted relative to the Sun.

References

Cygnus (constellation)
B-type supergiants
Cygni, Sigma
Cygni, 67
8143
202850
105102
Durchmusterung objects
J21172494+3923402